Arch Moscow is an international exhibition of architecture and design held annually since 1995. It is held in Moscow, Russia, in the Central House of Artist in the Crimean shaft (Krymsky val). The organizer is Expo Park Company.

References

External links 

Press releases
 Arch Moscow 2012 – press releases by cih.ru 
 Arch Moscow 2010 website

Photo gallery
 Arch Moscow 2011
 Arch Moscow 2010
 Arch Moscow 2009
 Arch Moscow 2008
 Arch Moscow 2007
 Arch Moscow 2006
 Arch Moscow 2005
 Arch Moscow 2004
 Arch Moscow 2003
 Arch Moscow 2002

See also
 Arch Moscow, the city's largest annual architecture fair
 Аrch-Moscow the International exhibition of architecture and design 2008
 Arch Moscow 2008 info

Culture in Moscow
Trade fairs in Russia
Architecture in Russia
Architecture festivals
Tourist attractions in Moscow
Festivals established in 1995